The Antenor Orrego Private University is a Peruvian private university located in Trujillo, La Libertad Region.
The university was named after the Peruvian journalist and political philosopher Antenor Orrego Espinoza.

Faculties

Faculty of Engineering

 Telecommunications Engineering
 Software Engineering
 Civil Engineering
 Computer Science
 Electrical Engineering
 Industrial engineering

Faculty of Human Medicine
 Human Medicine
 Psychology
 Dentistry

Faculty of Communication Studies
 Communication Studies

Faculty of Health Science
 Nursing
 Obstetrics

Faculty of Education and Humanities
 Early childhood education
 Primary education

Faculty of Economic Sciences
 Economics
 Administration
 Accountancy

Faculty of Law and Politic Sciences
 Law

Faculty of Architecture, Urbanism and Arts
 Architecture

Faculty of Agricultural Sciences
 Veterinary medicine
 Agronomy
 Food Engineering

External links 
Official website

See also
Victor Larco Herrera District
List of universities in Peru

References

Universities in Trujillo, Peru
Educational institutions established in 1988
1988 establishments in South America